Lunch shaming is a general term referring to when a student is singled out and embarrassed or shamed due to them or their parents not being able to pay for school lunches, or if they have any unpaid lunch debt. Lunch shaming can involve having a marker, like a stamp or wristband, indicating that the child cannot afford a school lunch due to debt or a lack of money, or it can involve being served less expensive cold lunches as opposed to hot lunches.

Lunch shaming is often blamed on the limited meal budgets public schools have to work with in the United States, which would lead many schools to pursue any outstanding debt in order to recoup costs.

Many states in the US have outlawed practices that single out students who have school lunch debt.

References 

School meal programs in the United States
Education in the United States